The third season of the American television series Bones premiered on September 25, 2007, and concluded on May 19, 2008, on Fox. The show moved back to its original time slot, airing on Tuesdays at 8:00 p.m. ET before moving to Mondays at 8:00 p.m. ET in 2008. Although a full slate of 20 episodes were produced, the 2007–2008 Writers Guild of America strike interfered with the writing of Season 3, and the network rearranged the broadcast schedule to compensate. One episode from the second production season, "Player Under Pressure", was moved to the third broadcast season, and six episodes from the third production season were moved to the fourth broadcast season. Due to this rearrangement, the show had an extended hiatus after "The Santa in the Slush" aired on November 27, 2007; the show returned on April 14, 2008. The season averaged 8.9 million viewers.

Cast and characters

Main cast 
John Francis Daley joined the cast this season, originally appearing as a guest star in three episodes, and then being promoted to a series regular and appeared in the opening credits beginning with episode 9.

Emily Deschanel as Dr. Temperance "Bones" Brennan, a forensic anthropologist
David Boreanaz as FBI Special Agent Seeley Booth, the official FBI liaison with the Jeffersonian
Michaela Conlin as Angela Montenegro, a forensic artist
Eric Millegan as Dr. Zack Addy, Dr. Brennan's lab assistant and forensic anthropologist
Tamara Taylor as Dr. Camille Saroyan, a forensic pathologist and the head of the forensic division
T. J. Thyne as Dr. Jack Hodgins, an entomologist
John Francis Daley as Dr. Lance Sweets, an FBI psychologist who studies the relationship between Dr. Brennan and Agent Booth

Recurring cast 
Patricia Belcher as Caroline Julian, a prosecutor
Nathan Dean as FBI Special Agent Charlie Burns
David Greenman as Marcus Geier, a forensic technician
Ryan O'Neal as Max Keenan, Brennan's father
Loren Dean as Russ Brennan, Brennan's brother
Eugene Byrd as Dr. Clark Edison
Ty Panitz as Parker Booth, Booth's son

Episodes 
This season featured the season-long story arc revolving around the cannibalistic serial killer known as Gormogon. In the season finale, the team discovers the Gormogon's identity and in the process, also uncover a horrifying secret: one of their own has been secretly working with Gormogon as well. The episode "Player Under Pressure" was originally supposed to air during the second season in April 2007, but was delayed in the wake of the Virginia Tech massacre. The original version included references to Hodgins planning to ask Angela to move in with him when they were already engaged at this point, so they re-shot new scenes for Hodgins and Angela.

DVD release 
The third season of Bones was released on DVD (subtitled "Totally Decomposed Edition") in region 1 on November 18, 2008, in region 2 on November 17, 2008 and in region 4 on March 4, 2009. The set includes all 15 episodes of season three on a 5-disc set presented in anamorphic widescreen. The first four episodes of broadcast season four, which were part of production season 3, are included as bonus episodes on the region 1 and 2 releases. Special features include "Director's take", a series of episodic featurettes—"The Vault", "Making of the Body", "Car Crash-Exploding Van", "Squints", and "The Angelator". Three episodes ("The Knight on the Grid", "The Santa in the Slush" and "The Baby in the Bough") include their extended versions, while "Player Under Pressure" (an episode originally produced during season two) includes both the aired and original unaired version. Also included is a gag reel.

References 

General references

External links 
 
 

Season 03
2007 American television seasons
2008 American television seasons